Henry Graham Dakyns, often H. G. Dakyns (1838–1911), was a British translator of Ancient Greek, best known for his translations of Xenophon: the Cyropaedia and Hellenica, The Economist, Hiero and On Horsemanship.

Life
Henry Graham Dakyns was born on Saint Vincent in the West Indies, the second son of Thomas Henry Dakyns of Rugby, Warwickshire. His mother Harriet Dasent was the sister of George Webbe Dasent, translator of the Icelandic sagas. He was educated at Rugby School and Trinity College, Cambridge, where he graduated BA in 1860.

Dakyns was a tutor for Lord Alfred Tennyson's children, and subsequently House Master and Assistant Master at Clifton College from 1862 to 1889. Though he never played himself, he started the Rugby Football Club at Clifton College.

Graham had numerous correspondences with Tennyson and his wife, Henry Sidgwick, John Addington Symonds and T.E. Brown and other nineteenth century literary figures.

Translations
Agesilaus, Project Gutenberg
Anabasis, Project Gutenberg
The Cavalry General
Cyropaedia, Gutenberg Press 
The Economist, Gutenberg Press 
Hellenica, Gutenberg Press
Hiero by Xenophon, Gutenberg Press
The Memorabilia, Project Gutenberg
On Horsemanship by Xenophon, Gutenberg Press
On Revenues, Project Gutenberg
The Polity of the Athenians and the Lacedaemonians, Project Gutenberg
The Sportsman, Project Gutenberg
The Symposium, Project Gutenberg

Works on Dakyns
Letters to a Tutor: The Tennyson Family Letters to Henry Graham Dakyns by Robert Peters. Scarecrow Press, 1989

References

External links

 
 
 
 Letters between T.E. Brown & Grahams
 Henry Graham Dakyns Papers. General Collection, Beinecke Rare Book and Manuscript Library, Yale University.

Alumni of Trinity College, Cambridge
1911 deaths
1838 births
Greek–English translators
People educated at Rugby School
19th-century British translators